Ryu Hyun-woo (born 8 September 1981) is a South Korean professional golfer.

Ryu has played on the Korean Tour, the OneAsia Tour since 2010 and the Japan Golf Tour since 2012. He won on the Japan Golf Tour in September 2012 at the Coca-Cola Tokai Classic. He won the 2013 GS Caltex Maekyung Open, co-sanctioned by the OneAsia Tour and the Korean Tour.

Professional wins (4)

Japan Golf Tour wins (2)

Japan Golf Tour playoff record (2–0)

OneAsia Tour wins (1)

1Co-sanctioned by the Korean Tour

Korean Tour wins (2)

1Co-sanctioned by the OneAsia Tour

Results in World Golf Championships

"T" = Tied

References

External links

South Korean male golfers
Japan Golf Tour golfers
1981 births
Living people